Charles Marvin (1804 – December 1, 1883) was a member of the Connecticut Senate representing the 12th district from 1846 to 1848 and from 1851 to 1852 and a member of the Connecticut House of Representatives in the sessions of 1836 and 1838.

He graduated from Yale College in 1823.  After leaving College he began to read law, but from trouble with his eyes was led to engage in farming in his native town, which occupation he afterwards adopted. He became a deacon in the Congregational church of his native town in 1841, and was through life earnestly interested in that church's welfare. In 1846, and again in 1847, and in 1851, he was chosen to the State Senate, and thus became ex officio in the two latter terms a member of the Corporation of Yale College. In 1848 he represented Wilton, Connecticut in the House, and in 1852 was appointed bank commissioner. He had already been for many years one of the directors of the Fairfield County Bank.  He died at his ancestral home in Wilton, Conn., December 1, 1883, in his 81st year, after a protracted illness.

In November, 1836, he married Clarina, third daughter of the Rev. Samuel Merwin, then of Wilton, who survived him, with three daughters and two sons.

References

External links 

1804 births
1883 deaths
Members of the Connecticut House of Representatives
Farmers from Connecticut
Connecticut state senators
Connecticut Whigs
19th-century American politicians
People from Wilton, Connecticut
Yale College alumni